Lewis R. Vaughn is a Republican member of the South Carolina Senate, representing the 4th District since 1988.

External links
South Carolina Legislature - Senator Lewis R. Vaughn official SC Senate website
Project Vote Smart - Senator Lewis R. Vaughn (SC) profile
Follow the Money - Lewis R. Vaughn
2006 2004 2002 2000 1998 1996 campaign contributions

South Carolina state senators
1938 births
Living people
People from Ware Shoals, South Carolina